Bubblegum Splash! were an indiepop or punk rock band from Salisbury, in the South West of England. The band featured Jim Harrison, Alan Harrison, Dave Todd, Marty Cummins, and Nikki Barr. The group disbanded in 1988.

Bubblegum Splash recorded for indie label The Subway Organisation, and their 1987 debut E.P. "Splashdown" reached the top twenty in two of the UK's "national" independent charts (NME and Melody Maker). The band released seven songs in total.

The band pioneered a lively scene in their home town that went on to feature other notable artists such as The Badgeman, Jane From Occupied Europe, The Nuthins, and The Mayfields. The band also appeared on a split flexidisc with Welsh indie band The Darling Buds given away with a fanzine in 1987.

Their work has since appeared on at least two retrospective compilation albums released by Cherry Red outlining the history of this genre.

References

British indie pop groups
British punk rock groups